Wade McMahon (born 17 May 1985) is an Australian Paralympic athlete who competes in sprinting and javelin events. McMahon had a stroke at birth and suffers from hemiplegia.

McMahon won bronze medals at the 2002 FESPIC Games in the 4 × 400 m relay, Men's Javelin F37 at the 2006 IPC Athletics World Championships and Men's 4 × 100 m T35-38 at the 2011 IPC Athletics World Championships. In 2006, McMahon received the 2006 Sports Achievement Award. At the 2008 Beijing Paralympics, he finished fourth in the Men's Javelin F37/38.

References

External links
Athletics Australia Results 

Living people
Paralympic athletes of Australia
Athletes (track and field) at the 2012 Summer Paralympics
Australian male sprinters
Australian male javelin throwers
1985 births
FESPIC Games competitors